Gregory Thomas Yelavich  (born 8 March 1957) is a competitive pistol shooter from Auckland, New Zealand. As well as winning numerous national pistol titles, Yelavich has the distinction of having won more Commonwealth Games medals than any other New Zealander (12). He was the New Zealand flag bearer at the closing ceremony of the 2006 Commonwealth Games. He has represented New Zealand at two Olympic Games — Seoul 1988 and Barcelona 1992.

In 1990, Yelavich was awarded the New Zealand 1990 Commemoration Medal. In the 1995 New Year Honours, he was appointed a Member of the Order of the British Empire, for services to sport.

Yelavich competes in International Shooting Sport Federation ISSF pistol shooting events.

References

External links 
 
 
 
 
 
 
 

1957 births
Living people
New Zealand male sport shooters
Commonwealth Games medallists in shooting
Commonwealth Games gold medallists for New Zealand
Commonwealth Games silver medallists for New Zealand
Commonwealth Games bronze medallists for New Zealand
Shooters at the 1986 Commonwealth Games
Shooters at the 1990 Commonwealth Games
Shooters at the 1994 Commonwealth Games
Shooters at the 1998 Commonwealth Games
Shooters at the 2002 Commonwealth Games
Shooters at the 2006 Commonwealth Games
Olympic shooters of New Zealand
Shooters at the 1988 Summer Olympics
Shooters at the 1992 Summer Olympics
Sportspeople from Auckland
New Zealand Members of the Order of the British Empire
New Zealand people of Croatian descent
Medallists at the 1986 Commonwealth Games
Medallists at the 1990 Commonwealth Games
Medallists at the 1994 Commonwealth Games
Medallists at the 1998 Commonwealth Games